Nogometni klub Grad, commonly referred to as NK Grad or simply Grad, is a Slovenian football club which plays in the town of Grad. The club was established in 1967.

Honours
Slovenian Third League
 Winners: 2018–19

Pomurska League (fourth tier)
 Winners: 2009–10

League history since 2002

References

Association football clubs established in 1967
Football clubs in Slovenia
1967 establishments in Slovenia